Hüseyin Furkan Uslu (born 6 September 2002) is a Turkish professional footballer who plays as a midfielder for TFF Third League club Bursa Yıldırımspor.

Professional career
Yıldırım is a youth product of Arabayatağıspor, and Denizlispor. He signed his first professional contract with Denizlispor on 26 January 2021. He made his professional debut with Denizlispor in a 5–1 Süper Lig loss to Fatih Karagümrük on 15 March 2021.

References

External links
 
 

2002 births
People from Osmangazi
Living people
Turkish footballers
Association football midfielders
Denizlispor footballers
Süper Lig players
TFF First League players
TFF Third League players